Bob Hamilton may refer to:

Bob "Bones" Hamilton (1912–1996), American football player
Bob Hamilton (1916–1990), American golfer
Bob Hamilton (died 2008), the model for Norman Rockwell's painting We, Too, Have a Job to Do

See also
Robert Hamilton (disambiguation)